Moonlight English Boarding School is one of the best and finest secondary school in Birgunj under SEE Nepal Government Board. It was established in 2037 B.S. at Reshamkothi, Birgunj, Parsa District, Nepal.

Student service and facilities

Science laboratories
The school has science laboratories with facilities for work in Physics, Chemistry and Biology. These encourage students to learn through experiments and researches.

Computer lab 
The school owns a computer lab hall with over 20 computers. Students take classes on computer programming, webpage development and Microsoft applications such as Word, Excel, and Power Point.

Classrooms 
The classrooms accommodate 40 to 50 students.

Residential hostel and dormitories 
The school has accommodation for its students in Day Hostel.

Study classes and tutorials are held in the mornings and evenings.

Transportation 
The school offers transportation facilities to its students at the parent's request.

Extracurricular activities

Sports 
MEBS is involved in cricket competitions and table tennis competitions. Moonlight School has been winning Football Cup organized by PABSON, Parsa for 3 years.

Educational trips 
Field trips are arranged, these include excursions the Botanical Garden, zoo, historical places, science experiments, and orphanage. An annual picnic is held. Social projects work is based on the social awareness and activities done by students.

Internal evaluation 
Internal evaluation of a student is done via monthly tests, terminal examinations, project works and involvement in club activities. Monthly progress reports on homework, note presentation and classroom performance are sent to parents. A parent teacher meeting is held to talk about each student's performance. MEBS has three terminal examinations in a session before the board exam (including pre-board).

References 

Schools in Nepal
Secondary schools in Nepal
Buildings and structures in Parsa District